Matthew Schellhorn (born 4 February 1977 in Yorkshire) is an English classical pianist.

Biography

Education
Matthew Schellhorn studied at Chetham's School of Music in Manchester and Girton College, University of Cambridge. His teachers included David Hartigan, Maria Curcio, Ryszard Bakst, Peter Hill and Yvonne Loriod.

Performances
Matthew Schellhorn's performances have been broadcast on BBC Radio 3 and Radio France.

He has given world premieres of works by Nicola LeFanu, Ian Wilson and Gráinne Mulvey. His 2009 commission Homage to Haydn from composers Tim Watts, Michael Zev Gordon, Cecilia McDowall, Cheryl Frances-Hoad, Colin Riley, and Jeremy Thurlow was later published in Muso Magazine. His 2014 disc, Ian Wilson: Stations, received positive press, with a four-star review from The Irish Times.

Schellhorn is particularly known for his performances of the music of Olivier Messiaen. His disc with the Soloists of the Philharmonia Orchestra, Messiaen: Chamber Works (Signum Classics SIGCD126) was an AllMusic Classical Editors' Favourite of 2008.

Politics and causes
Matthew Schellhorn launched his 2014 CD Ian Wilson: Stations with a fundraising concert for Christians in the Holy Land.

During 2014, he publicly campaigned against the Assisted Dying Bill tabled by Lord Falconer of Thoroton, writing for The Catholic Herald. He was also later interviewed in the newspaper.

In November 2018, he was appointed Patron of The Sand House Charity, which carries out educational, artistic and heritage projects and activities linked with South Yorkshire.

In March 2022, the National Youth Arts Trust (Charity No. 1152367) announced Matthew Schellhorn as a Patron.

Honours and arms

Honours
Foreign
  2021: Sovereign Military Order of Malta
 Cross pro Merito Melitensi

Other
  2017: London - Liveryman of the Worshipful Company of Musicians

Arms

Publications 
 ‘Yvonne Loriod’ in Scholl, Robert. Messiaen in Context. Cambridge: Cambridge University Press (forthcoming)
 ‘New Recording of Rare Manuscripts by Herbert Howells’: Naxos Musicology International, June 2020

Discography
 Herbert Howells: Piano Music, Vol. 1, Naxos Records, Naxos 8.571382 (July 2020)
 Colin Riley: Shenanigans, NMC Recordings, NMC D241
 Geoffrey Bush & Joseph Horovitz: Songs, Naxos Records, Naxos 8.571378 (July 2017)  
 Patrick Nunn: Morphosis, Red Sock Records, RSR003CD (February 2016)  
 Ian Wilson: Stations, Diatribe Records, DIACD016 (April 2014)  
 Mulvey: Akanos, Navona, NV5493 (February 2014)  
 Outside, Nonclassical, NONCLSS013 (October 2011) 
 Messiaen: Chamber Works, Signum Classics, SIGCD126 (July 2008)

References

External links
 Matthew Schellhorn's official website
 Matthew Schellhorn at Naxos Records
 Matthew Schellhorn at Signum Records
 Matthew Schellhorn at Diatribe Records
 Matthew Schellhorn at The Catholic Herald
 

1977 births
Living people
People from Doncaster
Male classical pianists
English classical pianists
Pupils of Maria Curcio
People educated at Chetham's School of Music
Alumni of Girton College, Cambridge
Alumni of the University of Cambridge
21st-century classical pianists
Musicians from Yorkshire
21st-century British male musicians